Nikolai Rohde Laursen (born 19 February 1998) is a Danish professional footballer who plays as a winger for Eerste Divisie club Heracles Almelo.

Club career

Early career
Laursen is a youth exponent from Brøndby. He made his Danish Superliga debut on 26 April 2015 at age 17 against Vestsjælland replacing Alexander Szymanowski after 84 minutes in a 4–0 home win. He scored the fourth and last goal of the game, five minutes after coming on the pitch. On 17 May, he played his second first-team game against Silkeborg. On 7 June, he played his third and final game of the 2014–15 season, against Esbjerg fB.

PSV
On 15 June 2015, Laursen signed a three-year contract with Dutch club PSV who paid a fee of around €1 million. In 2015–16 pre-season, he practiced with the first team, after which he joined Jong PSV, the reserve team. He suffered an ankle injury almost right away, which sidelined him for several months. Laursen extended his contract with PSV in February 2016 until mid-2020. He tore a cruciate ligament in a league match away against Telstar on 28 October 2016, which made him miss the entirety of the season. Laursen made his comeback on 21 August 2017, at home against De Graafschap (2–2). He made more than thirty appearances for Jong PSV during the 2017–18 season, in which he scored ten times. He was awarded the Bronze Bull in May 2018 for being the most talented player in the fourth period of the Eerste Divisie season.

Laursen was sent on a one-year loan to Brøndby on 27 June 2018 with an option to buy. After a mixed season with the club, Brøndby chose not to trigger the option, and he returned to PSV.

Emmen
Laursen signed a three-year contract with Emmen in July 2019. The club had avoided relegation from the Eredivisie the season before, and he immediately grew into a starter, making his debut on 8 August in the 0–1 home loss to Groningen.

Heracles Almelo
On 8 June 2021, it was announced that Laursen had signed a three-year contract starting 1 July with the option of an additional season with Heracles Almelo.

References

External links
 

1998 births
Living people
People from Vallensbæk Municipality
Danish men's footballers
Denmark under-21 international footballers
Denmark youth international footballers
Association football wingers
Danish Superliga players
Eredivisie players
Eerste Divisie players
Brøndby IF players
Jong PSV players
FC Emmen players
Heracles Almelo players
Danish expatriate men's footballers
Danish expatriate sportspeople in the Netherlands
Expatriate footballers in the Netherlands
Sportspeople from the Capital Region of Denmark